Chulalongkorn University (CU), nicknamed Chula, is a public and autonomous research university in Bangkok, Thailand. The university was originally founded during King Chulalongkorn's reign as a school for training royal pages and civil servants in 1899 (B.E. 2442) at the Grand Palace of Thailand. It was later established as a national university in 1917, making it the oldest institute of higher education in Thailand.

During the reign of Chulalongkorn's son, King Vajiravudh, the Royal Pages School became the Civil Service College of King Chulalongkorn. The Rockefeller Foundation was instrumental in helping the college form its academic foundation. On 26 March 1917, King Vajiravudh renamed the college "Chulalongkorn University".

Chulalongkorn University is a comprehensive and research-intensive university. It is ranked as the best university in Thailand in many surveys, quality of students, quality of research, quality in particular subjects, university reputation, environmental management systems. According to QS world university ranking 2017, CU is placed 245th in the world, 45th in Asia, 1st in Thailand, and 201–250 in the world graduate employability ranking. It is also ranked as Thailand's No. 1 university from various organizers such as Center for World University Rankings, Round university ranking, Academic Ranking of World Universities.

Chulalongkorn University is one of the National Research Universities and supported by the Office of Nation Education Standards and Quality Assessment of Thailand. Moreover, CU is the only Thai university which is a member of Association of Pacific Rim Universities (APRU).

Admission to CU is highly selective, and applicants are required to have high test scores. Applicants ranking in the top 10 national scores are chosen for study at CU.

CU is composed of nineteen faculties, a School of Agriculture, three colleges, ten institutes and two other schools. Its campus occupies a vast area in downtown Bangkok. Graduates customarily receive their diplomas from the King of Thailand, a tradition begun by King Prajadhipok (Rama VII).

History

King Chulalongkorn's reforms, aimed at transforming Thai society into a modern state demanded trained officials specialized in various fields. In 1899, the King founded the "Civil Service Training School" near the north gate of the Royal Palace. Those who graduated from the school would become royal pages. As royal pages, they learned how to manage organizations by working closely with the king, which was a traditional way to enter the Siamese bureaucracy. After serving as royal pages, they would then serve in the Mahattai Ministry or other government ministries.

On 1 April 1902 the King renamed the school. It became the "Royal Pages School". On 1 January 1911, King Vajiravudh changed the name to "Civil Service College of King Chulalongkorn" as a memorial to his father and moved the school to Windsor Palace in the Pathumwan District.

The King subsidized the construction of a university campus and organized various schools around the city into Chulalongkorn. The college offered eight majors taught by five schools including;

 School of International Relations in the Royal Palace
 School of Teacher Training at Baan Somdet Chao Phraya
 Royal Medical College at Siriraj Hospital
 School of Legal Studies
 School of Mechanical Sciences at Windsor Palace

King Rama VI realized that education should be provided not only to bureaucrats, but to all people. On 26 March 1917, the college was upgraded to "Chulalongkorn University", and the schools were transformed into four faculties: Faculty of Arts and Sciences, Faculty of Public Administration, Faculty of Engineering, and Faculty of Medicine.

The Rockefeller Foundation reorganized the curriculum of the Faculty of Medicine. In 1923, the Faculty of Medicine became the first faculty to accept secondary school (Mattayom) graduates. The remaining faculties then followed suit. After the 1932 Revolution, the People's Party wanted legal and political studies to be independent of "royalists" so they moved the Faculty of Law and Political Science to the new Thammasat University in 1933.

In 1938, Chulalongkorn University's Preparatory School was founded to provide pre-collegiate education to students. Those who managed to enter the university had to spend two years in the Preparatory School before going on to the Faculty of Arts and Sciences. The Preparatory School, however, ceased to be a university-owned preparatory school in 1947 and became the independent Triam Udom Suksa School. Later, the university established Chulalongkorn University Demonstration School (CUD) as a laboratory school for primary and secondary education for the Faculty of Education.

Symbols

Phra Kiao

Since the establishment of the Royal Pages School, the former name of the university, King Chulalongkorn authorized the use of his personal emblem as a school emblem. The emblem is called Phra Kiao, a Thai coronet, royal headgear for young princes and princesses. As the school was transformed into the university, the King authorized the use of phra kiao. Today, phra kiao appears not only in formal letters and transcripts, but also on souvenirs made by the university as well as student uniforms.

Student uniform
Undergraduates are required to wear a uniform when studying, taking examinations, or contacting the university in person. Male graduate students wear a collared or polo shirt and dark trousers. Women wear a plain blouse with long skirt.

Originally, the university uniform was adapted from a uniform worn by Chulalongkorn's heirs. The uniform was later updated, but the original is reserved as a formal uniform. The formal uniform is usually worn by student leaders and graduates.

Today, the ordinary uniform for male undergraduate students consists of a plain white shirt with long or short sleeves and black (or dark blue) trousers. Wearing a dark blue necktie with colored phra kiao engraved on its front is mandatory for first-year students but optional for higher years. However, a black tie with a silver phra kiao pin is usually used by upperclass student in some faculties. Female students are required to wear a short-sleeved blouse with a fold along the spine. The buttons must be made of metal, and a small phra kiao emblem must be pinned on the right breast. A dark blue or black pleated skirt with any black, white, or brown shoes are worn. For female first-year students, white leather shoes are mandatory. Chulalongkorn University's uniforms have long been the template of many uniforms used in other universities in Thailand.

Academic dress 

The academic dress of Chulalongkorn University is based on ceremonial attire called khrui, a gown made from very fine mesh. The robe was originally reserved for pre-ordination monks, ministers and royal family members. Like dresses worn in the United Kingdom, the robe is open-fronted and calf-length. Cap and hood, however, are omitted. The gown is faced and lined with a felt strip dyed according to the status of the wearer and decorated with gold ribbons. The elbow and wrist portion of the gown is also wrapped with the same felt strip. 

Bachelor's and master's gown is faced and bordered with a black felt strip, while a doctor's gown uses a scarlet felt strip. This colour scheme is similar to one used at the University of Oxford: Black for bachelors and masters (and doctors in undress); Scarlet for doctors (in full-dress). The cord (bachelor) or ribbon (master and doctor) dyed with the faculty colour is attached to the centre of the felt strip longitudinally.  Officers' (lecturers, university council members, vice-chancellor and chancellor) gown is faced with a pink strip and centred with a gold thread, regardless of the faculty. The specially designed gown with a yellow facing is reserved for the king of Thailand, who is also Visitor to the University.

VVajiravudh authorized the university to use the traditional Thai gown instead of the western one, but the regulation on this matter was enacted in 1930 by Prajadhipok.

Example of felt strips

Rain Trees

Rain trees are common on the university campus. They are associated with the cycle of student life. Fresh green leaves at beginning of the term represent the freshmen's naivete. As the tree produces slimy pods and sheds leaves, the ground beneath it becomes slippery, thus alerting students to prepare for examinations. If they walk carefully, they will not slip (pass examinations). If they walk heedlessly, they will slip and fall (fail examinations).

From 1937–1957, many rain trees were cut down to free space for new buildings. King Bhumibol Adulyadej noticed the dramatic decrease in the number of rain trees. On 15 January 1962, he brought five trees from Hua Hin and planted them in front of the university auditorium, proclaiming: "...I give these five trees as an eternal memorial.".

Organization

 

Chulalongkorn University consists of 19 faculties, three colleges, one school and many institutes which function as teaching and research units.

In 1917, the university had four faculties: Arts and Sciences, Public Administration, Engineering, and Medicine. The Faculty of Law was established in 1933 as part of the Faculty of Law and Political Science. From the 1930s to the 1950s it expanded to various fields including Pharmacy (1934), Veterinary Science (1935), Architecture (1939), Dentistry (1940), and Commerce and Accountancy (1943). In 1943, the regency government under General Phibun separated the Faculty of Medicine, Dentistry, Pharmacy, and Veterinary Science to become the University of Medical Sciences, now Mahidol University. In 1948, the Faculty of Political Science was re-established. The Faculty of Education was established in 1957 from the School of Teacher Training at Baan Somdet Chao Phraya. In 1967, the Faculty of Veterinary Science was returned from Kasetsart University and the Faculty of Medicine at Chulalongkorn Hospital was moved from University of Medical Sciences to Chulalongkorn University. In 1972, the Faculty of Dentistry and Faculty of Pharmacy were reinstated.

The Office of the Commission on Agricultural Resource Education (OCARE) was established in 2009. It is not an administrative office, but a school in which teaching and research are carried out. It admits students from two groups: one from northern Thai provinces (Nan, Phayao, Phrae, Uttaradit) and another from the rest of country. It was upgraded to the School of Agricultural Resources with full degree-granting power on 5 March 2014. In 2014 it became the School of Agriculture, Chulalongkorn University (SAR). 

In 2019, aiming to address global industry changes and demand for relevant education, Chulalongkorn University launched Chulalongkorn School of Integrated Innovation (ScII) to offer the first in Asia interdisciplinary undergraduate degree in both arts and science - Bachelor of Arts and Science in Integrated Innovation (BAScii).

Health sciences 
 Faculty of Allied Health Sciences
 Faculty of Dentistry
 Faculty of Medicine
 Faculty of Nursing
 Faculty of Pharmaceutical Sciences
 Faculty of Psychology
 Faculty of Sport Sciences
 Faculty of Veterinary Science

Science and technology 
Faculty of Architecture
 Faculty of Engineering
 Faculty of Science
 School of Agricultural Resources

Social science and humanities 
 Faculty of Commerce and Accountancy (Also known as  Chulalongkorn Business School)
 Faculty of Arts (Letters)
 Faculty of Communication Arts
 Faculty of Economics
 Faculty of Education
 Faculty of Fine and Applied Arts (Art)
 Faculty of Law
 Faculty of Political Science

Integrated Faculty 
 School of Integrated Innovation

International programs 

CU's international programs offers 99 international programs, including 17 Bachelor, 48 Master and 34 Doctoral programs. Admissions for international students are based on the guidelines issued by the Council of University Presidents of Thailand.

Bachelor's Degrees:
 Chula International School of Engineering
 Faculty of Science 
 Faculty of Architecture - International Program of Design and Architecture -INDA- and CommDe
 School of Integrated Innovation - Bachelor of Arts and Science in Integrated Innovation (BAScii)
 Chulalongkorn Business School - The Bachelor of Business Administration
 Faculty of Architecture
 Faculty of Communication Arts
 Faculty of Economics
 Faculty of Arts
 Faculty of Political Science
 Faculty of Psychology

Graduate institutes 
 College of Population Studies
 College of Public Health Science
 Graduate School
 Language Institute
 Petroleum and Petrochemical College
 Sasin Graduate Institute of Business Administration

Research institutes 
 Aquatic Resources Research Institute
 Energy Research Institute
 Environmental Research Institute
 Institute of Asian Studies
 Institute of Biotechnology and Genetic Engineering
 Metallurgy and Materials Science Research Institute
 Social Research Institute
 Transportation Institute

Associated institutes 
 Police Nursing College
 Red Cross College of Nursing

Research
Chulalongkorn University has research organizations in many fields of study. 

 Aquatic Resources Research Institute 
 Energy Research Institute 
 Environment Research Institute 
 Social Research Institute 
 The Institute of Biotechnology and Genetics Engineering
 Metallurgy and Material Science Research Institute 
 Institute of Asian Studies
 Transportation Institute

Rankings 

 QS World University Rankings by Subject 2020: Chula ranked number one in Thailand in 20 disciplines.
 In the QS Asia University Rankings 2016. Chulalongkorn has been ranked as the top Thai university and 45th in Asia
 In the QS World University Rankings 2017/18. Chulalongkorn is ranked the 1st in Thailand and 245th in the world
 In the QS graduate employability rankings 2016. Chulalongkorn is No. 1 university in Thailand and No. 151 - 200 in the world
 In the Center for World University Ranking or CWUR, Chulalongkorn is ranked as number 1 university in Thailand and 308th in world rankings in 2017, considered by alumni, researches, quality of curriculums and instructors.

 In the Round University Ranking 2017. Chulalongkorn is ranked the 1st in Thailand and ranked 398th in the world.
 In the RUR Research Performance World University Rankings 2016. Chulalongkorn is No. 1 university in Thailand and No. 424 in the world
 In the CWTS Leiden Ranking 2016. Chulalongkorn is ranked the first in Thailand and 432nd in the world.
 In the THE World University Rankings 2016. Chulalongkorn is ranked 601–800 in the world.
 In the RUR Reputation Rankings 2016. Chulalongkorn is No. 1 university in Thailand and No. 182 in the world.
 In the SCImago institutions Ranking, which ranks international researches of universities. Chulalongkorn is ranked 475th in World rankings in 2016, up six places from last year.
 In the Academic Ranking of World Universities 2017. Chulalongkorn is No. 1 university in Thailand and No. 401-500 in the world.
 In the Nature Index, the affiliations of high-quality scientific articles. Chulalongkorn is ranked the 1st in Thailand in 2016.
 US News ranked Chulalongkorn 522th in the world. based on the university's reputation, medium, citations, international cooperation, and he quantity of PhD students.
In the 2018 Times Higher Education Emerging Economies Index, Chula ranked 126.
 QS World University Ranking by Subject 2018

Other Rankings
 In the UI Green Metric-City Center, Chulalongkorn was ranked the 1st in national rankings and the 15th in world rankings. considered by Setting and Infrastructure, Energy and Climate Change, Waste, Water, Transportation and Education.
 The Webometric ranking indicates quantity and quality of the university's medium, considered by being searched by search engines, online documents, and citations in Google Scholar.  Chulalongkorn is ranked the 1st in national rankings 548th in the world.

Scholarships

Research scholarships 
 The 90th Anniversary of Chulalongkorn University Scholarship
 CU.Graduate School Thesis Grant
 Overseas Research Experience Scholarship for Graduate Student
 Overseas Academic Presentation Scholarship for Graduate Students
 Overseas Academic Presentation Scholarship Option II for Graduate Student's and Postdoctoral Fellow's Publication
 Domestic Academic Presentation Scholarship for Graduate Student
 Postdoctoral Fellowship

Education scholarships 
 The 100th Anniversary Chulalongkorn University for Doctoral Scholarship
 H.M. King Bhumibhol Adulyadej's 72nd Birthday Anniversary Scholarship
 Thainess Study Scholarship for Graduate Students
 60/40 Support for Tuition Fee 
 Teaching Assistant Scholarship
 Research Assistant Scholarship
 Tuition fees Scholarship for Master to Doctoral 
 ASEAN Scholarship
 Scholarship for International Graduate Students

Campus

Centenary Park

The west side of Chula's campus is the site of this innovative park. It has gradually sloping portions. Its 28 rai expanse contains a water retention pond with a capacity of 3.8 million liters and a rain garden. Both help to ameliorate Bangkok's seasonal flooding. It was built to commemorate Chula's 100th anniversary in 2017.

Accommodation 
Chulalongkorn University International House (CU iHouse) is a 26-storey, 846-unit, on campus residence for international students and lecturers. Rooms come fully furnished with air conditioning, modern conveniences, 24-hour security and safety systems. The residence is included in the university's shuttle bus services.

Honorary degrees 
The university has bestowed honorary degrees on heads of state and other international dignitaries, including two U.S. presidents:
Lyndon B. Johnson, October 29, 1966
Bill Clinton, November 26, 1996
Nelson Mandela, July 17, 1997

Traditions 
Chulalongkorn University student traditions include:
 Chula–Thammasat Traditional Football Match: The annual football match between Chulalongkorn University and Thammasat University in January at Suphashalasai Stadium. It first started in 1934.
 Loy Krathong: an annual celebration of the full moon night, which usually falls on the first full moon day in November. Since the festival is open to the public, it attracts many people, especially Chulalongkorn students and faculty and those who live in downtown Bangkok, to come to the university to float their krathongs on the university's pond.
 Chulalongkorn Academic Exhibition: a triennial academic and research exhibition presented by Chulalongkorn University's students and faculty. It is regarded as one of the most important academic fairs in Thailand.

Student activities and clubs 

The university is host to 40 student clubs, including the Buddhism and Traditions Club, the Religious Studies Club, the Mind Study Club, and the Thai Classical Music Club. Chulalongkorn also has a Morals Network, which actively campaigns to protect student activities from damaging the university's reputation. The university's Cheer Club annually organizes the Chula-Thammasat traditional football match.

Notable alumni 

 Princess Maha Chakri Sirindhorn, princess of Thailand
 Princess Sirivannavari Nariratana, princess of Thailand
 Thawan Thamrongnawasawat, former Prime Minister of Thailand
 Wan Muhamad Noor Matha, former Speaker of the House of Representatives and President of the National Assembly of Thailand
 Surakiart Sathirathai, former Deputy Prime Minister of Thailand Foreign Affairs, Education and Culture and the former Thailand's candidate for United Nations Secretary-General in 2006
 Kittiratt Na-Ranong, Thai politician, former Deputy Prime Minister of Thailand and Minister of Finance
 Mingkwan Saengsuwan, Thai politician, former Deputy Prime Minister of Thailand and Minister of Commerce
 Kosit Panpiemras, Thai politician, former Deputy Prime Minister of Thailand 
 Yongyuth Wichaidit, Thai politician, former Deputy Prime Minister of Thailand 
 Sudarat Keyuraphan, Thai politician, former Minister of Public Health
 Sutham Sangprathum, Thai politician, former deputy minister of the Ministry of Interior
 Thanathorn Juangroongruangkit, Thai politician, leader of the Future Forward Party
 Mallica Vajrathon, a sociologist, political scientist and former United Nations Senior Staff member
Chit Phumisak, a Thai author, philologist, historian, poet and Communist rebel. His most influential book was The Face of Thai Feudalism (Chom Na Sakdina Thai). He also has been described as the "Che of Thailand"
 Binlah Sonkalagiri, a winner of the S.E.A. Write Award
 Nidhi Eoseewong, Thai historian, Fukuoka Asian Culture Prize
 Panipak Wongpattanakit, Gold medal Women's −49 kg taekwondo at the 2020 Summer Olympics
 Tawin Hanprab, Silver medal Man's −58 kg taekwondo at the 2016 Summer Olympics
 Chanatip Sonkham, Bronze medal Man's −49 kg taekwondo at the 2012 Summer Olympics
 Kitti Thonglongya, Thai ornithologist and mammalogist. He is probably best known for two discoveries of endangered species
 Thanpuying Dhasanawalaya Sornsongkram, daughter of Princess Galyani Vadhana
 Pinyo Suwankiri, Thailand National Artist in the area of applied arts (Thai architecture)
 Borwornsak Uwanno, a Thai legal expert and a cabinet secretary-general under the Thaksin-government
Suporn Watanyusakul, pioneer in vaginoplasty & facial reconstruction
 Pakorn Chatborirak, Thai actor and model.
 Nilawan Pintong, Thai feminist, Ramon Magsaysay Award
 Chiranan Pitpreecha, Thai writer, winner of the S.E.A. Write Award
 Win Lyovarin, a Thai writer, two-time winner of the S.E.A. Write Award
 Yong Poovorawan, a noted scientist in the fields of pediatric hepatology, viral hepatitis and virology, and an expert on the H5N1 avian influenza virus
 Banjong Pisanthanakun, co-directed and co-written of a box-office hit film such as Shutter
 Alexander Rendell, Thai actor and model
 Tawan Vihokratana, Thai actor and model
 Thitipoom Techaapaikhun, Thai actor
 Natapohn Tameeruks, Thai actor and model
 Urassaya Sperbund, Thai actor and model
 Pachara Chirathivat, Thai actor and TV presenter
 Suppasit Jongcheveevat, Thai actor and model
 Waruntorn Paonil, Thai actress and singer
 Sahaphap Wongratch, Thai actor
 Direk Lavansiri, Professor Emeritus of Engineering at Chulalongkorn University

International reputation 
 Two medals from Olympic 2016 Rio de Janeiro games
 Tawin Hanprab, Silver medal, Men's −58 kg taekwondo.
 Panipak Wongpattanakit, Bronze medal, Women's −49 kg taekwondo.
 The PH21 team, Computer Engineering students at Chulalongkorn University, got the 1st prize from the Microsoft Imagine Cup 2016 in the games category
 Chulalongkorn University Concert Choir Won Gold Award in World-Class Musical Competition 2014

Robocup competitions 
The university RoboCup team, Plasma‐Z, got several prizes from the robotics competition as follow.
In 2005, almost reached the quarter-final at Osaka RoboCup.
In 2006, the third place and technical challenge at Bremen RoboCup.
In 2007, second place Atlanta World RoboCup.
In 2008, finally, the team got champion of World RoboCup Small‐Sized Robot League at Suzhou, China.
Moreover, another university Robocup team, Plasma-RX has participated in Rescue robot league at World RoboCup 2008, Suzhou, China, and won the first prize and the best-in-class in mobility award.

See also 
 Academic dress of Chulalongkorn University
 Sasin Graduate Institute of Business Administration of Chulalongkorn University
 Education in Thailand
 Chula United football club
 Department of Statistics | Chulalongkorn Business School

References

External links 

 
 Graduate School, Chulalongkorn University
 Sasin Graduate Institute of Business Administration of Chulalongkorn University
 School of Integrated Innovation
 CU-TEP
 Panoramic view of Chulalongkorn

 
Universities and colleges in Bangkok
Education in Bangkok
Educational institutions established in 1917
ASEAN University Network
Pathum Wan district
1917 establishments in Siam
Universities established in the 20th century
Monuments and memorials to Chulalongkorn